Moran Buttress is a steep bluff  south of Koopman Peak, rising over  and forming a major projection between Davisville Glacier and Quonset Glacier along the north wall of the Wisconsin Range in Antarctica. It was mapped by the United States Geological Survey from surveys and U.S. Navy air photos, 1960–64, and was named by the Advisory Committee on Antarctic Names for Lieutenant Commander Clifford D. Moran, U.S. Navy, an aircraft pilot during Operation Deep Freeze 1966 and 1967.

References

Cliffs of Marie Byrd Land